Haniska is a village and municipality in the Prešov District, Prešov Region in eastern Slovakia.

History
In historical records, the village was first mentioned in 1288.

Geography

Population 
It has a population of about 732 people (2020-12-31).

Points of interest
At Haniska, there is a mediumwave broadcasting station, which uses a 220 metres tall guyed mast.

Genealogical resources
The records for genealogical research are available at the state archive "Statny Archiv in Presov, Slovakia"
 Roman Catholic church records (births/marriages/deaths): 1720-1896 (parish B)
 Greek Catholic church records (births/marriages/deaths): 1792-1895 (parish B)
 Lutheran church records (births/marriages/deaths): 1704-1895 (parish B)

See also
 List of municipalities and towns in Slovakia

References

External links
 
 
 http://www.statistics.sk/mosmis/eng/run.html 
 Surnames of living people in Haniska

Villages and municipalities in Prešov District
Šariš